Saeid Davarpanah (born September 7, 1987) is an Iranian professional basketball player, currently playing as a guard for Mahram Tehran BC in the Iranian Basketball Super League. He is also a member of the Iranian national basketball team and competed at the 2008 Olympic Basketball Tournament.He was the youngest basketball player of Iran national basketball team at the 2008 Olympic Basketball He has been recognized as the best player in the Iranian Basketball League several times since 2008. He also competed in the 2019 FIBA Asia Champions Cup, and his brilliance in these competitions made him more popular among the fans of the Iran Basketball League. He is especially popular among league fans in southern Iran due to his long and colorful presence in the Naft Abadan and Petrochimi.

Honours

National team

Asian Games
: 2010, Guangzhou, China
2019 FIBA Asia Champions Cup
: 2019, Bangkok, Thailand

References

External links 
Davarpanah on Instagram

Living people
1987 births
Sportspeople from Tehran
Iranian men's basketball players
Shooting guards
Olympic basketball players of Iran
Basketball players at the 2008 Summer Olympics
Asian Games bronze medalists for Iran
Asian Games medalists in basketball
Basketball players at the 2010 Asian Games
Medalists at the 2010 Asian Games
2010 FIBA World Championship players
Basketball players at the 2020 Summer Olympics